Aria Mia Loberti is an American actress. She is set to star as Marie-Laure Leblanc in the Netflix film All the Light We Cannot See.

Biography 
Born and raised in Rhode Island, Loberti attended the University of Rhode Island from 2016 to 2020. She graduated summa cum laude with three majors—Philosophy, Communication Studies, and Political Science—and minors in Ancient Greek language and Rhetoric. She received her master's degree in ancient rhetoric with distinction in 2021 from Royal Holloway, University of London on a Fulbright Scholarship. She began her doctoral studies in ancient rhetoric at Pennsylvania State University in 2021.

She will play the lead role of Marie-Laure Leblanc in the upcoming Netflix's adaptation of the 2014 novel All the Light We Cannot See. Loberti landed the part after a global search. A fan of the book, she auditioned after learning about the search from a former childhood teacher. Despite no acting training, Loberti beat out thousands of submission to secure the role; it is her first ever acting role.

Personal life 
Loberti has a black Labrador retriever, Ingrid, from the organization Guide Dogs for the Blind.

In a TEDx Talk in 2018, she described her childhood struggles with bullying, abuse, and discrimination in school. These challenges inspired her to become an advocate, and she began speaking out for human rights at just four years old.

References 

Blind actors
21st-century American actresses
Year of birth missing (living people)
Living people
Place of birth missing (living people)
Alumni of Royal Holloway, University of London
University of Rhode Island alumni
Actors from Rhode Island